OrangeAcademy is a professional basketball club based in Weißenhorn, Germany. The team currently plays in the ProA, the second highest professional division in Germany. The team plays its home games at the Dreifachturnhalle, which has a capacity of 1,200 people.

The club serves as development team of the Basketball Bundesliga side Ratiopharm Ulm, which sends its young players to the team on loan.

Honours
ProB
Champions (1): 2016–17

Season by season

Logos

Notable players 

  Andrija Grbović
  Igor Miličić Jr. 
  Jeremy Sochan

References

External links
Official website (in German)

Basketball teams in Germany
Basketball teams established in 1994